Venkateswaran Dakshinamoorthy (9 December 1919 – 2 August 2013) was a veteran carnatic musician and composer and music director of Malayalam, Tamil and Hindi films, predominantly in Malayalam films. He has set scores for the songs in over 125 films. He composed as many as 1400 songs over a period of 63 years. Fondly known as Swami, he was instrumental in pioneering classical music-based film songs. Revered as one of the forefathers of the Malayalam music industry, he has mentored many of the renowned contemporary singers and composers including P Leela and K.J Yesudas. In 1998, he was honoured with the J. C. Daniel Award, Kerala government's highest honour for contributions to Malayalam cinema.

Biography

Dakshinamoorthy was born in a Tamil Brahmin family on 9 December 1919 as Venkateswaran Dakshinamoorthy Iyer, to Parvathiammal and D. Venkateswara Iyer a Bank Officer, at Mullakkal in Alappuzha, Travancore, British India. He was the eldest among the seven children of his parents, whom he funnily described as 'those like seven notes'. He had two brothers and four sisters. His interest in music was nurtured by his mother, who taught him keerthanas of Thyagaraja Swamikal when he was still a child. He had grasped at least 27 songs just by hearing them when they were being rendered by his mother and sister. When he was ten years old, Venkatachalam Potti in Trivandrum taught him Carnatic music and the tutelage continued for three years. His first public performance was when he was 13 years old, at the Ambalapuzha Sri Krishna temple. It was his habit to offer prayers to "Vaikkathappa Annadhaana Prabho" or Lord Shiva daily, in the morning, and before going to bed. His primary schooling was in Sanaathana Dharma Vidyashaala, Allepey, till 5th standard. He continued in Kiliparam School. He completed his HSC at Shri Moola Vilasa High School, Trivandrum, then he decided that music has to be his future. After finishing S.S.L.C., he learned carnatic music from Venkatachalam Potty in Trivandrum. Swami came to Vaikom at the age of 16, practiced and taught music. During that period when he was 20-22, he received "The Nirmaalya Darshan" of Vaikathappan for three and a half years continuously. This feat played a big part in his route to greatness.

The Marriage at Vaikom
There is an incident which happened in Ambalapuzha. One midnight as Ambalapuzha was lashed by torrential rain, ganjira vidwan Kaduva Krishnan knocked at the doors of Dakshinamoorthy's house, inviting him to perform at a marriage kutcheri at Vaikkom the next day. His mother permitted him to do so and the two walked up to the Karumaadi boat jetty at Ambalapuzha and reached Vaikkom the next morning, 8 a.m. After having a bath and a good darshan of Vaikkathappa's, they reached Kaidarathu Madam for the concert. On the request of Kochi-based Konkini Tavil Vidwan to teach music to his relatives, Dakshinamoorthy remained at Vaikkom. He stayed there for 42 months and during this stay, he would sing daily at the temple, attend Nirmalya Darsanam and sang on all Ashtamis at the temple.

Music career

Entry into film industry
In 1948, he came to Chennai with his parents. He married Shrimathi Kalyani on 28 January 1948. He entered the film world in 1948. He debuted in the film industry in 1950 with Nalla Thanka, produced by Kunchacko and K. V. Koshy under the banner of K & K Productions. The hero of the film was Augustin Joseph, a well-known stage actor and singer, who was also the father of renowned singer K. J. Yesudas. The film also had songs sung by Augustin Joseph. The producers wanted Dakshinamoorthy to compose a song on Lord Vinayaka and that was the first song he began his film industry career with. He also composed music for "The Opera" at Kalamandalam during the same period, where he graced through 8 Operas and 30 dance dramas

Film career
Dakshinamoorthy went on to set scores for K. J. Yesudas, his son Vijay Yesudas (for the film Idanazhiyil Oru Kalocha, directed by Bhadran) and his granddaughter Ameya (for the film Shyama Raagam, awaiting release) as well, thus achieving a rare treat.

He set the scores for many songs written by Sreekumaran Thampi and Abhayadev, forming a famous musician-songwriter duo like the Vayalar Ramavarma – G. Devarajan and P. Bhaskaran – Baburaj duos. He had R. K. Shekhar, father of the music director A. R. Rahman as his assistant for a few films, who later became a musician in his own right. He went on to direct music for over 125 films including Navalokam, Seetha, Viyarppinte Vila, Sri Guruvayoorappan, Kadamattathachan and Indulekha.

His evergreen compositions include Swapnangal... Swapnangale ningal...(Kavyamela), Pattu padiyurakkan njan...(Seetha), Uthara swayamvaram...(Danger Biscuit), Kattile pazhmulam...(Vilaykku Vangiya Veena),  Hrudaya Saralie, Chandrikayil, Kaatile Paalmulam, Manohari Nin, Sowgandhigangale, Aakashamand Vathil pazhuthilooden...(Idanazhiyil Oru Kalocha).

He was guru of many singers and Music Directors including P. Leela, P. Susheela, Kalyani Menon and Ilaiyaraaja. In 1971 he won the Kerala State Film Award for Best Music Director.

The duo of Swami and Srikumaran Thambi contributed countless chart toppers to the Malayalam Film Industry. In 2003, he received the coveted 'Sangeetha Saraswathi' Award from the hands of revered Poojya Sri Guruji Viswanath of Manava Seva Kendra, Bangalore. In the year 2008, he composed four songs for the Malayalam movie Mizhikal Sakshi.

Even at the age of 93, his endeavours towards music had not slowed down. He was working on a movie project, "Shyama Raagam", rendering music for the same.

Performances
His first trip to Madras was in 1942, when he was to sing in a 30-minute programme on AIR. He was a regular visitor to the AIR for the next 4 years after which he settled in Mylapore in 1948. Between 1942 and 1957, he performed around 500 carnatic concerts in Kerala. He has also performed at international venues such as the Dubai Dala Festival at Dubai, Bahrain, Abu Dhabi and Kuwait. "Dakshinamurthy Sangeetha Utsavam" has been taking place every year since 2013 at Perungotukara.

Disciples
His disciples included talented singers like N.C. Vasantakokilam, Kaviyoor Revamma, Kalyani Menon, Ambili, Mithun, Srilatha, Shereen Peters, Bhavadhaarini, Mithun Jayaraj etc.

Singers/Composers 
Generations of singers have sung under the Bheeshmacharya of Indian Music including, P. Leela, Kamukara Purushothaman, Balamurali Krishna, K.J.Yesudas, P.B. Srinivas, Ghantashaala, T.M.S., S.P.B., Augustin Joseph, Jeyachandran, A.M. Raja, Vijay Yesudas and his daughtera, M.L.V, P. Susheela, S. Janaki, L.R. Eashwari, Madhuri, Ambili, Kalyani Menon, K.S. Chitra, Vaani Jeyaram, Sujatha, Madhubala Krishnan, Unni Krishnan, Krishnaraj, Minmini, Swetha, Unni Menon, M.G. Sreekumar, Jolly Abraham, Biju Narayanan, and Manjari.

Ilaiyaraaja, R. K. Shekhar (father of A.R. Rahman) and many more composers have been assistants in Swami's music recording sessions.

Introductions 
Dakshinamoorthy is to be highly credited for his introduction of P. Suseela to Malayalam cinema through 'Seetha'. The song 'Pattu Paadi Urakkam' sung by P. Suseela in that film is still popular in Kerala. He also introduced other singers such as Ambili, K.P. Brahmanandham, Shereen Peters, Vinodhini, Sree Latha, Kalyani Menon, etc.

Books 
He has written three books namely Thiagabrahmam (Tamil – 1965), Aathma Dheepam (Tamil – 1989) and Sathya Mithram (Malayalam – 1992).

His private masterpieces bearing 108 of his own compositions (Keerthanas) was released as book during his first death anniversary at Makreri Temple, Kerala with the name "Raagaabharanam" honouring his priceless contribution to the field of music.

Pious nature 
A devout Hindu throughout his life, Dakshinamoorthy started his speeches telling Sarvacharacharangalkkum Namaskaram, Charachara Guruvinum Namaskaram (Welcome to all the living and non-living creatures in the world, and also to their teacher). He was a devotee of Lord Shiva of Vaikom Temple in Kottayam district, after whom he was named, and he celebrated his 60th, 70th, 80th and 90th birthdays by offering Sahasrakalasham at Vaikom Temple. He was also a devotee of Lord Guruvayurappan, and used to visit Guruvayur temple too. Being a Brahmin, he was a vegetarian as he adhered to the traditional diet. He offered his wooden model of the Sabarimala Temple inside which he worshipped his revered idols to the Subrahmanya-Hanuman temple at Makreri in Kannur district. The Saraswathi Mandapam is now a home ground bearing all the crowning jewels of his lifetime achievement in the form of Awards and Trophies. The Thiagaraaja Akandam started at Makreri Ambalam and has been taking place for more than 12 years.

Awards

 2019 – Kerala State Film Award – Special Mention (posthumously) – Shyamaragam (Music director)
 2013 – Swathi Sangeetha Puraskaram – Government of Kerala
 2010 – Ramashramam Unneerikutty Award
 2010 – Honorary Doctorate by Mahatma Gandhi University
 2010 – Lifetime Achievement Award – Mirchi
 2008 – Amrita TV Award
 2007 – Swaralaya Yesudas Award for lifetime contributions to Malayalam film music
 2003 - Abhaya Dev Award 2003 for outstanding contribution for Indian Music
 2000 - "Kalakairali Award 1998-99" for Human integration
 1998 – J. C. Daniel Award from the Government of Kerala
 1998 - Golden Jubilee Award from Film Fans Association, Madras
 1997 - The First "Kamukara Award’" presented by Vice-President Shri K.R. Narayanan
 1997 - Vayalar Memorial Cultural Award 1997" by Kala Kairali and Vayalar Memorial Cultural Award Academy
 1990 - Cine Technicians’ Platinum Jubilee of Indian Cinema 1913-1988 for outstanding contributions to Cinema
 1990 - The Prestigious Cinema Technicians Association of South India, Ramnath Award
 1990 - Madras Kerala Samajam Award
 1982 - Kerala Sangeetha Nataka Akademi Fellowship
 1981 - Indian Talkies Golden Jubilee Award & Gold Medal" for 50 Years of dedicated service in Indian Cinema, from the President of India, Shri. Neelam Sanjeeva Reddi
 1971 – Kerala State Film Award for Best Music Director for Vilakku Vangiya Veena, Marunnattil Oru Malayali and Muthassi
 1965, 1966, 1967, 1968, 1969 - Film Fans Association Award
 1961 - Kerala Sangeetha Nataka Academy Award

Titles

Honours

Discography

Death
Despite his advanced age and failing health, Dakshinamoorthy continued to work in musical field, and composed songs for many albums. In July 2013, he made his last achievement as a composer - giving songs for four generations in a single family. This happened through giving a chance to Ameya Vijay, the daughter of Vijay Yesudas and granddaughter of K. J. Yesudas. Dakshinamoorthy gave songs to Yesudas' father Augustine Joseph, a veteran drama actor and singer, in his very first film in 1950. He later used Yesudas to sing most of his songs. He also introduced Vijay Yesudas in 1987 through a sloka in the film 'Idanazhiyil Oru Kalocha'.

Dakshinamoorthy died at his home in Chennai at 6:30 PM on 2 August 2013, at the age of 93. He died peacefully in his sleep, which is considered auspicious for Hindus. His death was also on an Ekadashi day, which is also considered auspicious. He had plans to visit his daughter's home nearby along with his wife, and when he heard that the driver of the taxi in which he was to go would be late, he went to sleep. When the car arrived, his wife wondered why her husband was not ready. Then she went to call her husband, who did not respond. Death was confirmed soon, citing a cardiac arrest as the possible cause of death.

Dakshinamoorthy was cremated with full state honours at Besant Nagar electric crematorium. Thousands of famous people attended his funeral. The then Kerala State Cultural Minister K. C. Joseph represented the Kerala state. He is survived by his three children - two daughters and a son. Kalyani Ammal, his wife of 65 years, died on 22 October 2021, aged 91.

Notes

References

External links

 
 Musical Colossus, The Hindu
 V Dakshinamoorthy- A biography by Dakshin
 V Dakshinamoorthy composing at the age of 93
 Music composer V Dakshinamoorthy's divine musical journey
 Playlist of Swami's keerthanas

1919 births
2013 deaths
Carnatic composers
Carnatic instrumentalists
Male Carnatic singers
Carnatic singers
Malayalam film score composers
Kerala State Film Award winners
20th-century Indian musicians
Musicians from Alappuzha
Indian male film score composers
20th-century Indian male singers
20th-century Indian singers
J. C. Daniel Award winners
Recipients of the Kerala Sangeetha Nataka Akademi Fellowship